A dip is an upper-body strength exercise. Narrow, shoulder-width dips mainly trains the triceps, with major synergists being the anterior deltoid, the pectoralis muscles, and the rhomboid muscles of the back. Wide arm training places additional emphasis on the pectoral muscles, similar in respect to the way a wide grip bench press would focus more on the pectorals and less on the triceps.

Modern meaning
To perform a dip, the exerciser supports themselves on a dip bar with their arms straight down and shoulders over their hands, then lowers their body until their arms are bent to a 90 degree angle at the elbows, and then lifts their body up, returning to the starting position.

Variation

Usually dips are done on a dip bar, with the exerciser's hands supporting their entire body weight. For added resistance, weights can be added by use of a dip belt, weighted vest, or by wearing a backpack with weights in it. A dumbbell may also be held between the knees or ankles. For less resistance, an assisted dip/pull-up machine can be used which reduces the force necessary for the exerciser to elevate their body by use of a counterweight. One may also use resistance bands hooked under their feet to help if they lack the strength to properly perform a dip.

Another variation of the dip is done on gymnastic rings. Similar to a bar dip, the exerciser hand's grasps the rings, supporting their entire body weight. The unsteady nature of the rings adds additional challenge, although there are variations to make the exercise easier. 

In the absence of equipment, a lighter variation of the dip can be performed called the "Bench Dip". The hands are placed on one bench directly underneath the shoulders or on two parallel benches. The legs are straightened and positioned horizontally; the feet rest on another bench in front of the exerciser. This variation trains the upper body muscles in a similar though not exact manner as the normal dip, whilst reducing the total weight lifted by a significant amount. This exercise can be done also off of the edge of a sofa, a kitchen counter, or any surface that supports the lifter. It should be done under control.

Safety Measures 
Follow these safety measures while performing dip exercises.

 Keep your shoulders down and tucked away from your ears while performing dips.
 Focus on pushing from your triceps and not from your legs.
 Always do the dips exercises in proper form. 
 Take a big breath before you dip. Similarly, exhale while you perform the opposite movement. 
 Always dip with a full range of motion, but make sure you don’t go too low while dipping to avoid strain on the shoulder joint. 
 Do not perform challenging variations of dip exercises until you have mastered the standard exercises. 
 Start with bodyweight dips before moving to weighted dips.
 If you are a beginner, perform the dip exercises under the guidance of a certified fitness trainer.

See also
A muscle-up is a pull-up that transitions into a dip, whether on a horizontal bar or rings.
An iron cross in which the body is suspended upright while the arms are extended laterally, forming the shape of the Christian cross.
Pull-up (exercise)

References 

Bodyweight exercises
Strength training
Physical exercise